Exeresis may refer to the surgical removal of any part or organ, roughly synonymous to excision. However, it may specifically refer to clearing the uterus of its contents after a miscarriage, such as vacuum aspiration.

References

Surgical removal procedures